Rock Creek is a stream in Chisago and Pine counties, in the U.S. state of Minnesota.

Rock Creek was named for the rock outcroppings near its mouth.

See also
List of rivers of Minnesota

References

Rivers of Chisago County, Minnesota
Rivers of Pine County, Minnesota
Rivers of Minnesota
Tributaries of the St. Croix River (Wisconsin–Minnesota)